César Jasib Montes Castro (born 24 February 1997) is a Mexican professional footballer who plays as a centre-back for La Liga club Espanyol and the Mexico national team.

Club career

Monterrey
During a youth league playoff match with Pob. Miguel Alemán against Monterrey, he caught the attention of the opposing team. He was eventually brought onto Monterrey's youth team and on 2 August 2015, Montes played his first match with Monterrey against Portuguese team Benfica on the inauguration of the Estadio BBVA Bancomer. Montes came in as a substitute for the second half, and at the 48th minute he scored the first ever-goal in the Estadio BBVA Bancomer. Monterrey defeated Benfica 3–0.

Montes made his official debut for Monterrey on 29 July 2015, against Correcaminos UAT in an Apertura 2015 Copa MX group stage match, where Monterrey defeated Correcaminos 3–1. At the end of the 2016 Clausura, he was listed in the Best XI.

At the end of December 2019, he would win the 2019 Apertura finals against América.

With Monterrey's victory of the 2019–20 Copa MX, they had obtained the continental treble.

Clásico Regiomontano

Clásico Regiomontano matches against crosstown rivals Tigres UANL have proven to be significant for Montes, scoring three goals against them to date. He would make his league debut on 19 September 2015 against Tigres UANL, contributing a 40-meter long ball assist to Rogelio Funes Mori to score the only goal for Monterrey where they lost Monterrey lost 3–1.  On 14 May 2016, he would score Monterrey's only goal of the second leg of the Clausura 2016 championship quarter-final against Tigres UANL, losing 2–1, but with an aggregate score of 4–3 in favor of Monterrey to allow them move onto the semi-final against América. On 29 October 2016, he would tie the game against Tigres UANL, 1–1. On 21 April 2017, Montes scored the only goal in a 1–0 victory over Tigres UANL.

Espanyol
On 27 December 2022, Montes moved abroad and joined La Liga side RCD Espanyol, with a contract until 2028.

International career

Youth
Montes was part of the roster that participated in the 2018 Toulon Tournament. He would go on to appear in all group stage matches including the semi-final, except for the final where Mexico would go to lose 1–2 against England since he picked up an injury in the previous match against Turkey. He would go on to be included in the Best XI team of the tournament.

On 7 July 2016, Montes was named in Mexico's 21-man squad that would participate in the 2016 Summer Olympics in Rio de Janeiro, Brazil. He would appear in all of Mexico's group stage matches but Mexico would finish third in their group and were thus eliminated from the competition.

Ruled out for the 2020 CONCACAF Men's Olympic Qualifying Championship as it was not a FIFA-sanctioned tournament, Montes was called up to participate in the 2020 Summer Olympics. He won the bronze medal with the Olympic team.

Senior
Montes was called up by the senior national team to participate in the 2017 CONCACAF Gold Cup. He would make his debut on 13 July 2017 during a group stage match against Jamaica, coming in as a substitute for Rodolfo Pizarro at half-time, finishing the game at 0–0.

On 6 June 2019, Montes was called up by coach Gerardo Martino to participate in the CONCACAF Gold Cup. He appeared as a substitute in the group stage match against Cuba and as a starter in the final group stage match against Martinique as Mexico went on to win the tournament.

In October 2022, Montes was named in Mexico's preliminary 31-man squad for the 2022 FIFA World Cup, and in November, he was ultimately included in the final 26-man roster.

Style of play
A ball-playing defender that has shown maturity despite at a young age, Montes has a great range of passing, and has shown on a few occasions that he's able to pick out long-range passes, can execute a well-timed, and accurate, slide tackle, has shown he is capable of contributing goals in set-pieces, and is good in the air and able to deal with high balls into the box.

Career statistics

Club

International

International goals
Scores and results list Mexico's goal tally first.

Honours
Monterrey
Liga MX: Apertura 2019
Copa MX: Apertura 2017, 2019–20
CONCACAF Champions League: 2019, 2021

Mexico U23
Olympic Bronze Medal: 2020

Mexico
CONCACAF Gold Cup: 2019

Individual
Liga MX Best XI: Clausura 2016
Liga MX Best Rookie: 2015–16
Liga MX All-Star: 2021
Toulon Tournament Best XI: 2018

References

External links

 Profile at the RCD Espanyol website
 
 
 

1997 births
Living people
Mexican footballers
Mexico international footballers
Footballers from Sonora
Sportspeople from Hermosillo
Association football defenders
C.F. Monterrey players
RCD Espanyol footballers
Liga MX players
La Liga players
Footballers at the 2016 Summer Olympics
Footballers at the 2020 Summer Olympics
Olympic footballers of Mexico
2017 CONCACAF Gold Cup players
2019 CONCACAF Gold Cup players
CONCACAF Gold Cup-winning players
Olympic medalists in football
Olympic bronze medalists for Mexico
Medalists at the 2020 Summer Olympics
2022 FIFA World Cup players
Mexican expatriate footballers
Mexican expatriate sportspeople in Spain
Expatriate footballers in Spain